The 2012 United States Women's Curling Championship took place from February 11 to 18 at the IceWorks Skating Complex in Aston, Pennsylvania (with the host city being listed as Philadelphia). It was held in conjunction with the 2012 United States Men's Curling Championship. The winning team, skipped by Allison Pottinger, will represent the United States at the 2012 Ford World Women's Curling Championship in Lethbridge, Alberta. The first and second placed teams, skipped respectively by Allison Pottinger and Cassandra Potter, earned qualification spots to the 2014 United States Olympic Curling Trials, which will determine the teams that will represent the United States at the 2014 Winter Olympics.

Road to the Nationals

As with last year, teams qualified for the women's nationals by qualifying automatically through the World Curling Tour Order of Merit or through a challenge round. Four teams qualified via the Order of Merit, while six teams qualified via the challenge round. The challenge round was held in Marshfield, Wisconsin, where the teams that did not qualify directly via the Order of Merit competed for the final six spots in the nationals.

Teams
The teams are listed as follows:

Round robin standings
Final round robin standings

Round robin results
All times listed in Eastern Standard Time.

Draw 1
Saturday, February 11, 4:30 pm

Draw 2
Sunday, February 12, 8:00 am

Draw 3
Sunday, February 12, 4:00 pm

Draw 4
Monday, February 13, 8:00 am

Draw 5
Monday, February 13, 4:00 pm

Draw 6
Tuesday, February 14, 12:00 pm

Draw 7
Tuesday, February 14, 8:00 pm

Draw 8
Wednesday, February 15, 12:00 pm

Draw 9
Wednesday, February 15, 8:00 pm

Playoffs

1 vs. 2 game
Thursday, February 16, 8:00 pm

3 vs. 4 game
Thursday, February 16, 8:00 pm

Semifinal
Friday, February 17, 4:00 pm

Championship final
Saturday, February 18, 10:00 am

References

External links
2012 Nationals Home
USA Curling Home

2012 in curling
United States National Curling Championships
Women's curling competitions in the United States
2012 in American sports
Curling in Pennsylvania
2012 in sports in Pennsylvania